To Chun Kiu (born 17 July 1994 in Hong Kong) is a Hong Kong professional footballer who currently plays as a goalkeeper for Japan Football League club Suzuka Point Getters.

Youth career
To was determined to be a goalkeeper since childhood and joined the Kitchee academy when he was 14. He began his high school career at Yan Chai Hospital Tung Chi Ying Memorial Secondary School until the 2011-12 season, when he transferred to Beacon College where he was a regular in goal. In the quarterfinals that seasons, he made two crucial saves in the penalty shootout win over perennial powerhouses La Salle College. Beacon College went on to win the 2011-12 Hong Kong Inter-School Football Competition.

Club career
In 2011, To trained with Sham Shui Po who were in the Hong Kong First Division at the time.

He signed with Metro Gallery in July 2012 and spent four seasons with the club. He made his professional debut on 23 October 2012 in a 3-0 loss to Citizen.

In 2016, To joined Pegasus and made one appearance with the club.

Ahead of the 2017-18 season, To joined newly rebranded Dreams. He made his first appearance for the club on 24 September in a Hong Kong Senior Shield match against Rangers.

On 2 July 2019, Dreams announced To as one of several departures from the club.

On 7 July 2019, To signed with new promoted club Happy Valley.

On 14 September 2021, To signed with newly promoted club HKFC following a successful trial.

On 8 August 2022, To joined Sham Shui Po. He left the club on 6 January 2023.

On 14 February 2023, To joined Suzuka Point Getters.

References

External links
To Chun Kiu at HKFA

1994 births
Hong Kong footballers
Hong Kong expatriate footballers
Hong Kong First Division League players
Hong Kong Premier League players
Japan Football League players
Sham Shui Po SA players
Metro Gallery FC players
TSW Pegasus FC players
Dreams Sports Club players
Happy Valley AA players
Hong Kong FC players
Suzuka Point Getters players
Expatriate footballers in Japan
Living people
Association football goalkeepers